Events from the year 1869 in France.

Incumbents
 Monarch – Napoleon III

Events
2 May - Folies Bergère opens in Paris as the Folies Trévise.
23 May - Legislative election held.
6 June - Legislative election held to elect the fourth legislature of the French Second Empire.
15 July - Hippolyte Mège-Mouriès files a patent for margarine.

Births
7 March - Paul Émile Chabas, painter (died 1937)
8 April - Charles Binet, Archbishop of Besançon and Cardinal (died 1936)
12 April - Henri Désiré Landru, serial killer (executed 1922)
23 April - Louise Compain, feminist author (died 1941)
29 July - Paul Aymé, tennis player (died 1962)
22 November - André Gide, author and winner of Nobel Prize in literature in 1947 (died 1951)
31 December - Henri Matisse, artist (died 1954)

Deaths
8 January - Joseph Jean Baptiste Xavier Fournet, geologist and metallurgist (born 1801)
8 March - Hector Berlioz, composer (born 1803)
31 March - Allan Kardec, founder of Spiritism (born 1804)
8 June - Felix-Joseph Barbelin, Jesuit influential in the development of the Catholic community in Philadelphia (born 1808)
6 September - Jean-Pierre Dantan, sculptor (born 1800)
7 September - Auguste Simon Paris, notary and entomologist (born 1794)
13 October - Charles Augustin Sainte-Beuve, literary critic (born 1804)
15 October - Charles Nicholas Aubé, physician and entomologist (born 1802)
31 December - Louis James Alfred Lefébure-Wély, organist (born 1817)

References

1860s in France